Lago Agrio Canton is a canton of Ecuador, located in the Sucumbíos Province.  Its capital is the town of Nueva Loja.  Its population at the 2001 census was 66,788. The region contains the Lago Agrio oil field which is at the heart of a high-profile court case against Chevron.

References

Cantons of Sucumbíos Province